Gahana Bije is the ceremonial visit which is done by once in a generation of the Gajapati Queens of Odisha where they do special Puja to Lord Jagannatha.

Ceremony
The ceremony includes many restrictions inside the Jagannath Temple, Puri. The queen can have darshan of the Lord as much as she can but she can perform ritual only once in her lifetime
At that time, all the aged priests and public should vacate the temple, and only one Brahmin boy and two Brahmin married ladies should accompany the queen to the sanctum sanctorum.
Then all other princely states of Odisha are invited to be present in Puri. The queen comes in a closed palanquin so that no body can witness her. Processions and martial arts are also performed before the palanquin. After coming to temple, all the gates are closed and queen makes special Puja to the sibling deities. Finally she is accompanied by His Highness Gajapati Maharaja to the Royal Palace.

History
Last time in 2007 the present queen of Gajapati Shri Dibyasingha Deba, Maharani Leelabati Pattamahadei at the age of 51 came for such Gahana Bije. In 1966 her mother-in-law Maharani Surjyamani Pattamahadei had her Gahana Bije on 26 October 1966. and on 18 September 1933 the then queen Chandramani Pattamahadei had visited the temple for Gahana Bije.

References

Jagannath
Odia culture